is a Japanese voice actress affiliated with IAM Agency.

Biography
She has longed for voice actors since she was in elementary school, and in her graduation collection, she has cited "voice actors" as her future dreams. She also revealed that she imitated a character in Hunter × Hunter. After graduating from the English department at the university, she became a voice actress.

Filmography

Anime
Castle Town Dandelion (2015), Shizuru
Himouto! Umaru-chan (2015), Nana Ebina
Crane Game Girls Galaxy (2016), Rei
Hybrid x Heart Magias Academy Ataraxia (2016), Aine Chidorigafuchi
Nazotokine (2016), Kyoko Minakami
Clione no Akari (2017), Sayaka Hama
Princess Principal (2017), Beatrice
Himouto! Umaru-chan R (2017), Nana Ebina
How Clumsy you are, Miss Ueno (2019), Yamashita
Date A Live IV (2022), Mukuro Hoshimiya

Anime films
Princess Principal: Crown Handler (2021), Beatrice

Video games
Himouto! Umaru-chan: Ikusei Keikaku, Nana Ebina
Azur Lane, Kako, Furutaka, Aoba, Kinugasa
Grand Chase: Dimensional Chaser, Sofia
Arknights, Durin, Provence
Gothic wa Mahou Otome, Nana Ebina and Kanaria (from Rozen Maiden, replacing Yumi Shimura)
GrimGrimoire OnceMore, Opalnaria Rain

References

External links
 Official agency profile 
 

Living people
Japanese video game actresses
Japanese voice actresses
Voice actresses from Kanagawa Prefecture
Year of birth missing (living people)
21st-century Japanese actresses